Ominakhon Zafarzhon kizi Khalilova (born 15 December 1998) is an Uzbek artistic gymnast.  She represented Uzbekistan at the 2019 World Championships.

Early life
Khalilova was born in Andijan, Uzbekistan.  She began training in gymnastics in 2004 and joined the national team of Uzbekistan in 2016.

Gymnastics career

2014–17
Khalilova competed at the Voronin Cup in 2014, 2015, and 2016.  She was added to Uzbekistan's national team in 2016.

In 2017 Khalilova competed at the Baku World Cup but did not qualify for any event finals.  She next competed at the 2017 Asian Gymnastics Championships where she placed 24th in the all-around.

2019
Khalilova began the season competing at the Baku and Doha World Cups and the Zhaoqing Challenge Cup.  In Zhaoqing she qualified to the balance beam final and finished fifth.

Khalilova was selected to represent Uzbekistan at the Asian Championships alongside Muattarkhon Abdurakhmonova, Diana Bakhtiyarova, and Indira Ulmasova. They finished seventh as a team.  Khalilova next competed at the 2019 World Championships.  During qualifications she finished 148th; she was the second highest scoring Uzbek gymnast after Oksana Chusovitina.

2021
Khalilova competed at the Varna Challenge Cup but did not qualify for any finals.  In October she competed at the South Central Asian Championships alongside Anastasiya Miroshnichenko, Giunaz Jumabekova, and Dildora Aripova.  They finished first as a team and individually Khalilova won silver in the all-around behind Miroshnichenko.  Additionally she qualified to two event finals.  During event finals Khalilova won silver on the balance beam behind Aripova and silver on floor exercise once again behind Miroshnichenko.

2022
At the Asian Championships Khalilova placed fourteenth in the all-around and qualified as an individual to compete at the 2022 World Championships.  In August Khalilova competed at the Islamic Solidarity Games alongside Oksana Chusovitina and Dildora Aripova.  They finished second as a team behind Turkey.  Individually Khalilova won silver on floor exercise behind Aida Bauyrzhanova.

Competitive history

References

External links
 

1998 births
Living people
Uzbekistani female artistic gymnasts
People from Andijan